The Theodosia River is a river in the Pacific Ranges of the South Coast region of British Columbia, Canada, flowing southwest into Theodosia Inlet in the Desolation Sound region.

See also
List of British Columbia rivers
Theodosia (disambiguation)

References

Rivers of the Pacific Ranges
South Coast of British Columbia
Sunshine Coast (British Columbia)
New Westminster Land District